Francisco Morato is a suburban city in the state of São Paulo in Brazil. It is part of the Metropolitan Region of São Paulo. The suburban city is served by the CPTM Line 7.

Notable people
Gabriel Dias de Oliveira Football player

References

Municipalities in São Paulo (state)